The Uzbekistan women's national rugby union team is a national sporting side that represents Uzbekistan in women's international rugby union. They played their first test match against Hong Kong in 2008.

History

Results summary
(Full internationals only)

Results

Full internationals

References

External links
 Uzbekistan on IRB.com

Asian national women's rugby union teams
Women's national rugby union teams
Uzbekistani rugby union teams
Rugby union
2008 establishments in Uzbekistan
Rugby clubs established in 2008